Leigh Robertson (born 21 May 1950) is  a former Australian rules footballer who played with Fitzroy in the Victorian Football League (VFL).

Notes

External links 		
		
		
		
		
		
		
Living people		
1950 births		
		
Australian rules footballers from Victoria (Australia)		
Fitzroy Football Club players